triOS College is a private career college in the province of Ontario, Canada. triOS College has 8 locations in Ontario, offering diplomas in Business, Technology, Healthcare and Law, with programs varying in length from 26 to 60 weeks, some including an internship. The college was established  in 1992 by Frank Gerencser and Stuart Bentley. The school is a member of Career Colleges Ontario.

Campuses
triOS has 8 campus locations across Southern Ontario In: Windsor, London, Kitchener, Hamilton, Brampton, Mississauga, Toronto, and Scarborough. A sister college called Eastern College, which is owned by triOS has 4 locations throughout Nova Scotia and New Brunswick.

Programs
Faculty of Law includes programs for:
Law and Security Officer
Law Clerks with Internship - program associated with the Institute of Law Clerks of Ontario 
Paralegal  - program accredited by The Law Society of Upper Canada
Police Foundations
Faculty of Business
Accounting and Payroll Administrator
Administrative Assistant
Advanced Business Office Applications
Business Administration: both a  Diploma Program, and an  Honours Program
Office Administrator
Supply Chain and Logistics Program
Faculty of Technology
Information Technology Professional
Information Technology Administrator
PC Support Technician
Enterprise Web & Mobile Developer
Applications Developer
Web Technology Specialist
Video Game Design & Development
Video Game Design Technologies

Faculty of Healthcare
Addiction Worker
Community Service Worker 
Early Childhood Education
Medical Office Assistant 
Pharmacy Assistant
Personal Support Worker
Physiotherapy/Occupational Therapy Assistant

Notable alumni
 Randa Markos, professional Mixed Martial Artist, current UFC Strawweight

References

Private colleges in Ontario